The men's decathlon at the 2011 European Athletics U23 Championships was held at the Městský stadion on 14 and 15 July.

Medalists

Schedule

Results

100 metres

Long jump

Shot put

High jump

400 metres

110 metres hurdles

Discus throw

Pole vault

Javelin throw

1500 metres

Final standings

Participation
According to an unofficial count, 22 athletes from 13 countries participated in the event.

References

External links

Decathlon
Combined events at the European Athletics U23 Championships